Below are the highest-grossing movie in Malaysia for 2010.

Top 10 highest-grossing movie

Highest-grossing Indian language movie
Below are the list of highest-grossing film from India in Malaysia

References

Lists of Malaysian films
Malaysia
2010 in Malaysia